Miss Earth 2011, the 11th edition of the Miss Earth pageant, was held on December 3, 2011 at the University of the Philippines Theater, inside the campus of the University of the Philippines Diliman in Quezon City, Philippines. Nicole Faria of India crowned her successor Olga Álava of Ecuador at the end of the event. The show was aired live by Channel V at 8:00 pm, while Star World broadcast on Sunday, 4 December at 6:00 pm, ABS-CBN and Studio 23 broadcast on the same day at 10:30 pm. There was also a delayed telecast of the show on The Filipino Channel and on the television stations of other participating countries.

The pageant was originally scheduled to be held at the Impact, Muang Thong Thani in Bangkok, Thailand, however the pageant organizers decided to move the pageant back to the Philippines due to the 2011 Thailand floods.

The three "elemental titles", which have equal ranking, were awarded to Miss Brazil Driely Bennettone as Miss Earth-Air 2011, Miss Philippines Athena Imperial as Miss Earth-Water 2011 title, and Caroline Medina of Venezuela as Miss Earth-Fire 2011.

Results

Placements

Special awards

Major awards
The following special awards were given:

Minor/Sponsor awards

Order of announcements

Top 16

Top 8

Top 4

Winning answer
Final Question in Miss Earth 2011: "Why the candidates chose education as the environmental initiative that world leaders should prioritize?"

Answer of Miss Earth 2011: "Education is the best solution for the environment because children are those who have to preserve the Earth for future generations." – Olga Álava, represented Ecuador.

Background music
 Opening: "The Beautiful People" by Christina Aguilera and "Papi" by Jennifer Lopez
 Swimswit Competition: "Sexy and I Know It" by LMFAO
 Evening Gown Competition: "Sunshiner (A)" by Matthew Cang
 Final Look: "Just the Way You Are" of Bruno Mars (by Christian Bautista) (Live)

Judges
The board of judges during the final competition were consisted of the following personalities:

Contestants
84 delegates competed for the title

Notes

Debuts

Returns 

Last competed in 2005:
 
 
Last competed in 2007:
 
 
 
Last competed in 2009:

Withdrawals

Did not compete
  - Kerry Moxam

Replacement
  - Nguyễn Thái Hà has been confirmed as a candidate to represent Vietnam this year. However, one day before leaving, she withdrew because of the family's emergency work. After Trương Thị May - expected representative of Vietnam in Miss Earth 2009 but did not attend because she was injured - refused because she was participating in the drama "Chau sa", supermodel Phạm Ngọc Thạch qualified to participate, Phan Thị Mơ, Top 5 Miss Vietnam World 2010 was granted permission to attend last minute.

References

External links
 

2011
2011 beauty pageants
Beauty pageants in the Philippines
2011 in the Philippines